The End, So Far is the seventh studio album by American heavy metal band Slipknot. It was released on September 30, 2022, through Roadrunner Records. This is the band's final album to be released through Roadrunner, whom the band signed with in 1998.

At a length of 57 minutes and 31 seconds, The End, So Far is the band's shortest studio album to date.

Background
On May 19, 2021, percussionist Shawn Crahan stated that the band had been currently making "god music". In an article published by Loudwire on June 9, 2021, Crahan revealed that a new Slipknot album would 'hopefully' be released in 2021. He also added that the band would be parting ways with Roadrunner Records following the release of the album.

In November 2021, the band started teasing new material on a new domain thechapeltownrag.com. Several snippets of a song were shown on the website leading to speculation of a new single that the band would later confirm on November 4, with the single titled "The Chapeltown Rag" slated for release the following day alongside its live debut at the Knotfest Roadshow in Los Angeles, California on November 5, 2021. In December 2021, Taylor revealed that the band were planning on mixing their seventh studio album in January, and hoped to release it by April 2022. He also stated that he preferred the material on their forthcoming seventh studio album to that on We Are Not Your Kind.

In February 2022, lead singer Corey Taylor announced in an interview with Eddie Trunk that the recording of the album had finished, and that it was in the process of being mixed. He described the record as a "heavier version" of their 2004 album Vol. 3: The Subliminal Verses.

On July 19, 2022, the band announced the album along with the album's second single "The Dying Song (Time to Sing)". On August 5, 2022, the band released the third single, "Yen". The full album was released on September 30, 2022.

On August 22, 2022, the band announced that there would be nine special editions of the album to be released, each featuring a picture of one of the band members on the cover.

The album is dedicated to co-founder and former drummer Joey Jordison, who died in his sleep in July 2021. The original vinyl and cassette releases of The End, So Far were misprinted as The End For Now.... In a Reddit AMA, Corey Taylor said that The End, So Far was always the album's intended title, and that the misprint had been caused by "somebody [who] fucked up and didn't double check" with the band.

Critical reception

The End, So Far received generally favorable reviews. At Metacritic, which assigns a normalized rating out of 100 to reviews from mainstream publications, the album received an average score of 80, based on 10 reviews.

Luke Morton of Kerrang! commented that The End, So Far was more of an album "rather than a selection of songs". He welcomed the new direction the band had taken with tracks such as the opening track "Adderall", a "six-minute, synth-driven track - with all clean singing", while still noting that the album retained Slipknot's trademarked heaviness, with "primal screams, blastbeats, and more scratching wizardry from Sid Wilson than we’ve heard in a long time".

Andrew Trendell of NME gave the album four stars out of five, comparing the band's new direction to David Bowie, Tool and Stone Temple Pilots, while also noting that heavier tracks like "Hivemind" and "Heirloom" would provide comfort for "Slipknot fans of old".

Blabbermouth.net, too, noted the band's new musical style, highlighting that, while singles such as "The Dying Song" and "The Chapeltown Rag" provided "skull-rattling heaviness and ululating waves of deathly riffing," tracks such as "Adderall" and "Medicine for the Dead" showed the band's, and in particular vocalist Taylor's, versatility and evolution.

Cervante Popé of Consequence Of Sound gave the album 9.1 out 10. "As a new release, it’s got more than enough exploratory factors to keep the band from sounding stale, but it also stays true to the sounds that have turned us all into maggots in the first place."

Reviewing the album for AllMusic, James Christopher Monger was also divided about it; "The End, So Far may not be a home run, but it proves that the band are still in it to win it, even if they're playing the long game."

Accolades

Commercial performance
The End, So Far debuted within the top ten in over ten countries worldwide, including peaks at the summit in several countries including Australia, Germany, Greece, Mexico, Switzerland and the United Kingdom. In the United States, the album debuted at number 2 on the Billboard 200, the first album of theirs not to debut at the summit since 2004's Vol. 3: (The Subliminal Verses) while selling 59,000 copies in the first week with 50,500 coming from pure sales. In the UK, the album outsold the reissue of George Michael's Older by 340 units after trailing to it in the midweek chart update, claiming the band its third number-one on the UK Albums Chart following 2001's Iowa and 2019's predecessor We Are Not Your Kind. It sold a total of 14,068 copies, 12,083 of which came from pure sales while also collecting an additional 2,005 album-equivalent units from streaming.

Track listing

Personnel
Credits retrieved from album's liner notes.

Slipknot
(#8) Corey Taylor – lead vocals
(#7) Mick Thomson – guitars
(#0) Sid Wilson – turntables, keyboards
(#4) James Root – guitars
(#5) Craig "133" Jones – samples, media, keyboards
(#6) Shawn "Clown" Crahan – custom percussion, backing vocals, art direction, photography
Alessandro Venturella – bass, piano
Jay Weinberg – drums, percussion
Michael Pfaff – custom percussion, backing vocals

Additional personnel
 Jennifer Prim – choir (1, 6, 12)
 Jahna Perricone – choir (1, 6, 12)
 Andrew Koch – choir (1, 6, 12)
 Carmen Sicherman – choir (1, 6, 12)
 Brian Wold – choir (1, 6, 12)
 Kat Green – choir (1, 6, 12)
 Gordon Glor – choir (1, 6, 12)
 Stacy Young – choir (1, 6, 12)
 John DeMartini – choir (1, 6, 12)
 Grainne Ward – choir (1, 6, 12)
 Lon Fiala – choir (1, 6, 12)
 Nicole Scates – choir (1, 6, 12)
 Carmel Simmons – choir (1, 6, 12)

Production
 Slipknot – production
 Joe Barresi – production, mixing, recording engineer
 Bob Ludwig – mastering
 Alex Linares – additional recording (10)
 Tristan Hardin – additional recording (10)
 Greg Gordon – additional recording (10)
 Matt Tuggle – assistant engineer 
 Kelsey Porter – assistant engineer 
 Brian Rajaratnam – assistant engineer 
 Jun Murakawa – assistant engineer 
 Jerry Johnson – drum technician 
 Billy Bowers – drum editing 
 Virgilio Tzaj – design
 Anthony Scanga – additional photography

Charts

Weekly charts

Year-end charts

References

2022 albums
Slipknot (band) albums
Roadrunner Records albums
Albums produced by Joe Barresi
Groove metal albums